Harish S. Mehta (born 9 October 1947) is the Founder and Executive Chairman of Onward Technologies Ltd. He is the founding member and the first elected Chairman (then President) of NASSCOM, a trade association of Indian Information Technology (IT) and Business Process Outsourcing (BPO) industry.

Early life and education 
Harish Mehta graduated as an Electrical Engineer from College of Engineering, Pune (COEP). He also holds a Masters in Electrical Engineering (Specialisation in Computers) from Brooklyn Polytechnic Institute, NY (United States). He returned to India after 6 very successful years in the US.

Career 
Harish Mehta worked with leading IT experts Ashank Desai, K. V. Ramani, Mr. F. C. Kohli, Adi Cooper, Saurabh Shrivastava, Nandan Nilekani and with 30 other software companies to start NASSCOM. It started from his office in 1988 as he is one of the founding members of NASSCOM. He was one of the Chief Architects for the Hinditron - Digital Joint Venture in India in 1987. He served as the Deputy Chairman and Managing Director of Onward Novell Software (I) Ltd. (1993-2005), a 50:50 JV between Onward Group and Novell Inc., which was the second largest personal software company globally at that time.

Harish Mehta was also the former Director of Gujarat Venture Funds Limited and a Founding member of Infinity Venture Fund, India's first corporate VC fund. He introduced the Silicon Valley-based organization The Indus Entrepreneurs (TiE) to Mumbai after which he served as the first President of TiE – Mumbai in 1999 and then as a member of TiE Global Board from 2001-2002. He was Managing Trustee of TPATI (Trust to Promote Advanced Technologies in India) which hosted ICCC-2002, the International Conference on Computers and Communications in August 2002 at Mumbai. He was appointed as the Director at The College of Engineering, Pune between 2010 and 2015.

Currently, Harish Mehta is the convenor of Chairman's Council in NASSCOM and President's Council of TiE Mumbai. He has been appointed as an Expert Advisor to the Executive Committee of the Board of Small Industries Development Bank of India (SIDBI) for its Fund of Funds operations.

Honours and awards 

Harish Mehta was honoured by Narendra Modi, current Prime Minister of India for his 25 years of exemplary contribution to NASSCOM in 2017. He received the honour of ‘CEO of the Year’ during an international seminar organized by NMIMS, Tata HRD Network and World HRD Congress in 1994. He was honoured with a fellowship on the occasion of 33rd Annual Convention of CSI. He was conferred Lifetime Achievement award for HR Excellence by Deccan Herald in 2004. He was honoured as Distinguished Alumni of COEP in 1995. He was also honoured with a Lifetime Achievement award by IMC Chamber of Commerce and Industry in 2018.

References

External links
 Profile  at Onward Technologies Ltd.
 Profile at Harish Mehta.

1947 births
Living people
Indian businesspeople
People from Amreli district